The following is a list of notable events and releases of the year 2015 in Swedish music.

Events

January

February
 7 – The first semi-final of Melodifestivalen was arranged. The three next semi-finals took place on February 14, 21, and 28.

March
 7 – The Melodifestivalen second chance took place on March 7.
 14 – The final of Melodifestivalen was carried out on March 14, 2015. Måns Zelmerlöw's song "Heroes" won the competition.

April
 25 – Gamlestaden Jazzfestival started in Gothenburg (April 25 – May 2).

May
 23
 Måns Zelmerlöw wins the Eurovision Song Contest 2015 for Sweden with his song "Heroes". It goes on to top the charts in Sweden, Greece, Iceland and Poland.

June
 4 – The Malmö Live venue is officially inaugurated in Sweden; it becomes the new home of the Malmö Symphony Orchestra.
 25 – The 3rd Bråvalla Festival opened near Norrköping (June 25–27).

July

August

September

October
 12 – The 30th Stockholm International Composer Festival opens at the Stockholms Konserthus, focusing on the work of Lili and Nadia Boulanger.

November

December
 11 – The 27 years old Martin Almgren won the final of Sweden's Idol series.

Album and singles releases

January

February

March

April

May

June

July

August

September

October

November

December

Deaths 

 January

 July
 13 – Bengt-Arne Wallin, Swedish composer, arrangeur, trumpeter, and flugelhornist (born 1926).

 November
 5 – Kjell Öhman, jazz pianist, hammond organist, and accordionist (born 1943).

 December
 22 – Peter Lundblad, singer "Ta mig till havet" (prostate cancer) (born 1950).

See also
Sweden in the Eurovision Song Contest 2015
List of number-one singles and albums in Sweden (see 2015 section on page)

References

 
Swedish music by year
Swedish
Music